Chitungwiza South is a constituency of the National Assembly of the Parliament of Zimbabwe located in Harare Province. It covers a part of Chitungwiza, a dormitory city near Harare. Its current MP since the 2018 election is Maxwell Mavhunga of the Movement for Democratic Change Alliance.

Electoral history 
In 2008, the MDC-Tsvangirai's Misheck Shoko was elected MP for the constituency, defeating ZANU-PF's Chikavange Chigumba, MDC-Mutambara's Rosemary Mutore, independent candidate Farai Manyepxa, ZPPDP candidate Foreward Ngwindingwindi and ZDP candidate Costa Gombera.

References 

Chitungwiza
Parliamentary constituencies in Zimbabwe